The Michoacán Fútbol Club is a Mexican football club based in Pátzcuaro. The club was founded on October 24, 2020, and currently plays in the Liga TDP.

History
In June 2020, Monarcas Morelia was relocated to Mazatlán and renamed Mazatlán F.C., after this fact, a local businessman began the steps to create a soccer team that would represent Michoacán in Mexican soccer and avoid any relocation in the future. On October 24, 2020, it was announced that the new club would be named Michoacán F.C. to represent the entire state, in addition to informing that the club would be registered in the Liga TDP but with the aim of reaching Liga MX in a period of five years.

At the beginning of 2021, the club's board began a survey among its followers to choose the city where they would play their home games, the towns of: Pátzcuaro, Morelia, Sahuayo, Apatzingán, Ciudad Hidalgo and Los Reyes were presented as candidates. On July 13, the city of Pátzcuaro was confirmed as the city chosen to host the team's home matches.

At the end of July, the club announced Adrián García Arias as the first coach in its history, subsequently, the club's shield was released, which makes references to representative elements of the state of Michoacán.

The team officially debuted on September 26, 2021, in the match, the club drew two goals against Delfines de Abasolo, Mauricio Farjeat scored the first goal in the club's history.

Stadium
Michoacán F.C. play its home matches in the Club Deportivo Adagol located in the city of Pátzcuaro, Michoacán. The venue has a capacity for 500 spectators.

Players

First-team squad

References 

Association football clubs established in 2020
Football clubs in Michoacán
2020 establishments in Mexico